Raoul Üksvärav (21 April 1928 Tallinn – 2 March 2016) was an Estonian economist and politician. He was a member of VII Riigikogu.

In 1952 he graduated cum laude from the Tallinn University of Technology's Department of Economics, majoring in industrial economics. From 1953 to 1956 he was a postgraduate student at the Institute of Economics of the Estonian SSR Academy of Sciences, in 1956 he defended his doctoral dissertation (approved in 1957), and in 1967 he defended his doctoral dissertation in economics (approved in 1969).

From 1963 until 1964 he was an exchange researcher at the University of California and Massachusetts Institute of Technology.

References

1928 births
2016 deaths
Members of the Riigikogu, 1992–1995
Members of the Riigikogu, 1995–1999
Tallinn University of Technology alumni
Academic staff of the Tallinn University of Technology
Politicians from Tallinn
Recipients of the Order of the National Coat of Arms, 3rd Class
Burials at Pärnamäe Cemetery
20th-century Estonian economists